Medical literature retrieval or medical document retrieval is an activity that uses professional methods for medical research papers retrieval, report and other data to improve medicine research and practice.

Medical search engine

Professional medical search engine
PubMed
GoPubMed
Pubget
Scopus
eTBLAST
Cochrane Reviews, The Cochrane Library
SciELO
Twease

Meta-search tools
Trip
NLM Gateway
Entrez, NLM's cross-database search
SUMSearch

Consumer health search engine
MedlinePlus by the U.S. NLM
Healthfinder by the U.S. HHS
Mednar
Healthline
Medstory
Healia

Search strategy

See also
 European Federation for Medical Informatics
 Evidence-based medicine
 Health informatics
 International Medical Informatics Association
 
 Medical Subject Headings

References

External links
 MEDLINE/PubMed
 William R. Hersh. Information Retrieval:  A Health and Biomedical Perspective. 2003, Springer-Verlag. 
 Vincenta B. Vincentb M. Ferreira CG. Making PubMed Searching Simple: Learning to Retrieve Medical Literature Through Interactive Problem Solving. 2005, The Oncologist, Vol. 11  No. 3  243-251 
 The Top Five Medical Search Engines on the Web at About.com by Wendy Boswell
 25 Search Engines Every Medical Professional Should Bookmark
 PubMed Alternative Engines at American University of Beirut University Libraries

Medical literature
Medical search engines